Sphenomorphus senja is a species of skink found in Malaysia.

References

senja
Reptiles described in 2015